A sub-program of the Conservation Reserve Program, the Conservation Reserve Enhancement Program (CREP) is a state-federal multi-year land retirement United States Department of Agriculture (USDA) program developed by states and targeted to specific state and nationally significant water quality, soil erosion, and wildlife habitat problems.  CREP uses the state funds to offer higher payments per acre to participants than the CRP.  States may enroll up to  through an approved CREP, and at least three states have more than one CREP. USDA has reserved  from the authorized  total to enroll through either this option or the continuous enrollment option.  Currently, 26 states have approved CREPs, and through March 2005, more than  had been enrolled under this option.  As of June 2005, proposals were pending for seven additional states.

See also
Environmental Benefits Index

References 

United States Department of Agriculture programs